The Puerta Bab al-Mardum, or Puerta de Valmardón, is a city gate of Toledo, Spain. It was built in the 10th century and is one of the oldest gates in the city. Its name 'mardum' is Arabic for 'blocked up'. Perhaps because its function was taken over by the Puerta del Sol. The Spanish name Valmardón is a rough, phonetic imitation of the Arabic. 'Mezquita Bab al-Mardum' is another name for the nearby Mosque of Cristo de la Luz.

External links
 Castilla-La Mancha, Descubre u siente
Page at Archnet

Bab al-Mardum
Buildings and structures completed in the 10th century